"Cirrus Minor" is a song written and performed Pink Floyd. It is the first track on their 1969 album Soundtrack from the Film More. The song would later be released on the compilation album Relics.

Writing and recording
The song is 5 minutes 18 seconds long. It was written  by Roger Waters and performed by David Gilmour on vocals and guitar and Rick Wright on organ. The song has a hallucinogenic, pastoral quality, with prominent organ and bird sound effects, like those later that year featured on the Ummagumma track "Grantchester Meadows". It was also included on Pink Floyd's compilation album Relics. The song features no drums, which creates a rather unusual feeling. The Hammond and Farfisa organ coda is similar to that found on the "Celestial Voices" section of "A Saucerful of Secrets". While the Hammond provides a stately foundation with an Em-Bm-D-A-G-D-B sequence, about 1/4 way into the coda Wright introduces the Farfisa which, run through a Binson Echorec platter echo, produces the swirly, trembly, echoey sound that hovers over the Hammond.

The opening birdsong is from a 1961 recording entitled "Dawn Chorus" and the single bird featured over the organ part is a nightingale also from 1961.  Both featured on an HMV sound effects single (together with a recording of owls) but presumably the band just borrowed the originals from the EMI sound effects library as EMI owned HMV.

Music
"Cirrus Minor" has an unusual chord sequence: 
E minor, E flat augmented, G major, C# minor 7, C major 7, C minor 7 and B 7. The chords are built around the chromatically descending bass line. The B 7, C major 7 and G major chords are the only chords which fit into the functional context of the E minor key. This chord sequence gives the song a surreal atmosphere.

Personnel
David Gilmour – acoustic guitar, double-tracked vocals 
Richard Wright – Farfisa organ, Hammond organ
Roger Waters – bass (at the end of the song), birdsong effects

Covers
"Cirrus Minor" was covered by the French artist Étienne Daho on his 2007 album, Be My Guest Tonight.

References

External links

1969 songs
Pink Floyd songs
Songs written by Roger Waters
Song recordings produced by David Gilmour
Song recordings produced by Roger Waters
Song recordings produced by Richard Wright (musician)
Song recordings produced by Nick Mason